Gano is an unincorporated community in Butler County, in the U.S. state of Ohio.

History
Gano was platted in 1874 by Charles Gano, and named for him. A post office was established at Gano in 1872, and it was discontinued in 1910.

References

Unincorporated communities in Butler County, Ohio
1874 establishments in Ohio
Populated places established in 1874
Unincorporated communities in Ohio